Piao is an album by Zhao Wei. This album sold out 300,000 in first ten days.

Track listing

Awards and nominations
6th Top Chinese Music Chart Awards
 Won: Favorite Female Artist
 Won: Top 10 Golden Songs of the Year-Gradually
 Won: Top 10 Golden Songs of the Year-Rainning Sunday
 Nominated: Best Female Artist
 Nominated: Best Album

12th ERC Chinese Top Ten Awards
 Won: Best On-stage Performance
 Won: Best Music Video-Gradually
 Won: Golden Song of the Year-Gradually
 Nominated: Favorite Artist

4th Sprite China Original Pop Music Chart Awards
 Won: Best All-round Artist
 Won: Favorite Artist on the Network
 Won: Golden Song of the Year-Rainning Sundy
 Nominated: Favorite Artist

12th China Music Chart Awards
 Won: TOP 15 Golden Melody of the Year-Gradually

References

External links
Sina.com Official Page
Tome.com Official Page

2004 albums
Zhao Wei albums